William Whalen may refer to:
 William J. Whalen, American non-fiction religious writer
 William J. Whalen III, 10th director of the National Park Service